Peter John Free (born 6 December 1971) is a former English cricketer.  Free was a right-handed batsman who bowled right-arm medium pace.  He was born in Norwich, Norfolk.

Free made his debut for Norfolk in the 2000 Minor Counties Championship against Cumberland.  Free played Minor counties cricket for Norfolk from 2000 to 2008, which included 9 Minor Counties Championship matches and 10 MCCA Knockout Trophy matches.   He made his List A debut against Cornwall in the 2000 NatWest Trophy.  He made 3 further List A appearances, the last coming against the Somerset Cricket Board in the 2nd round of the 2002 Cheltenham & Gloucester Trophy, which was played in 2001.  In his 4 List A matches, he scored 18 runs at an average of 9.00, with a high score of 12 not out.

References

External links
Peter Free at ESPNcricinfo
Peter Free at CricketArchive

1971 births
Living people
Cricketers from Norwich
English cricketers
Norfolk cricketers